The Source Presents:  Hip Hop Hits is the first annual music compilation album to be contributed by The Source magazine.
Released on December 16, 1997 and distributed through Polygram Records, Hip Hop Hits: Volume 1 features eighteen hip hop and rap hits.
Five tracks on the album had reached number-one on the Billboard Hot Rap Tracks chart:  "Bow Down," "Can't Nobody Hold Me Down", "Crush on You," "Elevators" and "Hypnotize".  Two of the songs, "Hypnotize" and "Can't Nobody Hold Me Down" reached number-one on the Billboard R&B/Hip-Hop and pop charts.

Commercial performance
It went to number 25 on the Top R&B/Hip Hop Albums chart (making it the highest charting Hip Hop Hits album on that chart to date) and peaked at number 38 on the Billboard 200 album chart.

Track listing

Notes
 signifies a co-producer.

References

Hip hop compilation albums
1997 compilation albums